South Korea is a sovereign state in East Asia, constituting the southern part of the Korean Peninsula. Highly urbanized at 92%, South Koreans lead a distinctive urban lifestyle; half of them live in high-rises concentrated in the Seoul Capital Area with 25 million residents and the world's sixth-leading global city with the fourth-largest economy and seventh-most sustainable city in the world. 

Driven by a highly educated and skilled workforce, it has the world's eighth-highest median household income, the highest in Asia, and its singles in particular earn more than all G7 nations. Globally, it ranks highly in personal safety, job security, and healthcare quality, with the world's third-highest health adjusted life expectancy and fourth-most efficient healthcare system. It is the world's largest spender on R&D per GDP, leading the OECD in graduates in science and engineering and ranking third in the Youth Wellbeing Index. Home of Samsung, LG and Hyundai-Kia, South Korea was named the world's most innovative country in the Bloomberg Innovation Index, ranking first in business R&D intensity and patents filed per GDP. As of 2014, it has the world's fastest Internet speed and highest smartphone ownership, ranking first in ICT Development, e-Government and 4G LTE coverage.

For further information on the types of business entities in this country and their abbreviations, see "Business entities in South Korea".

Largest firms 

This list shows firms in the Fortune Global 500, which ranks firms by total revenues reported before March 31, 2017. Only the top five firms (if available) are included as a sample.

Notable firms 
This list includes notable companies with primary headquarters located in the country. The industry and sector follow the Industry Classification Benchmark taxonomy. Organizations which have ced operations are included and noted as defunct.

 Samsung 
 Hyundai Group
 SK Group

See also 
 Chaebeol
 Economy of South Korea
 Education in South Korea
 KOSDAQ
 KOSPI
 Mobile phone industry in South Korea
Green Optics Co., Ltd.

References 

Korea, South